is the state-owned Uruguayan social security institute. Institutionalized in the Constitution of 1967, it is in charge of coordinating, organizing and executing state social welfare and social security services.

History 
Uruguay was one of the first countries in Latin America to have a social security system. However, in its origins, it was a set of various retirement funds created between the end of the 19th century and the beginning of the 20th century: Caja Escolar (1896-1934), Caja Civil (1904-1934, 1948-1967), Caja Military (1911), Public Services Employees Fund (1919), Jockey Club Employees Fund (1923), Bank Employees Fund (1925), Industry and Commerce Fund (1928-1934, 1948-1967), and the Industry, Commerce and Public Services Fund (1934-1948). In 1919 an old age pension law was passed. Finally, the 1967 Constitution institutionalized the Banco de Previsión Social, which unified the most numerous savings banks in number of affiliates: Civil, Industry and Commerce, and Rural.

During the civil-military dictatorship, the body was replaced by the General Directorate of Social Security through Institutional Act No. 9, of October 23, 1979. However, the institution would recover its previous name after the approval of Law No. ° 15,800, of January 17, 1989.

References

External links 

 Official website

Social security in Uruguay
Government-owned companies of Uruguay